{{Infobox television
| image                = Big Brother Célébrités (Quebec TV series).jpg
| caption              = 
| genre                = Reality competition
| based_on             = 
| presenter            = 
| country              = Canada (Quebec)
| language             = French
| num_seasons          = 3
| num_episodes         = 186 (as of 21 February 2023)
| network              = 
| first_aired          = 
| last_aired           = present
| related              = {{Plainlist|
 Companion shows
 Big Brother 7/7
 Big Brother : Les gérants de l'estrade
 Parent show
 Big Brother U.S.
 Big Brother Canada
 Related
 Big Brother Quebec}}
}}Big Brother Célébrités is the Quebec celebrity version of the international reality show Big Brother. It premiered on January 10, 2021 on Noovo. Produced by Banijay and Groupe Entourage, it is hosted by singer Marie-Mai Bouchard.

Similar in format to the American and Canadian English versions of the program, the show features a group of public figures from Quebec, known as housemates, living in a custom-built house under constant surveillance, with cameras and microphones to track their every word and action. They are cut off from the outside world, with no communication through internet or phones. The housemates compete in weekly challenges for power and safety before voting each other from the house. The last person standing wins a cash prize, a donation to a charity of their choice, along with additional prizes from the show's sponsors.

 History 
Big Brother Célébrités is the third French-language adaptation of the Big Brother format in Canada, all of which have aired on the same network. A French-Canadian version of Loft Story, the France-produced version of the series, premiered in 2003 on the original incarnation of the Noovo network, Télévision Quatre-Saisons (TQS). Following TQS's rebranding to V in 2009, Loft Story was succeeded by an official Quebec-produced edition of Big Brother in 2010, featuring civilian contestants. This aired for only one season. On 24 August 2020, one week before the network's third rebranding to its present name of Noovo, Bell Media announced that a French-language celebrity version of Big Brother would start in the winter of 2020–2021. On 26 October 2020, it was announced that singer Marie-Mai Bouchard would host, fronting the premiere, weekly evictions, special live episodes and the final.

The first season premiered on 10 January 2021, and lasted for 13 weeks. The success of the show led to Noovo announcing a second season, which premiered on 9 January 2022.

 Format 
The format of the show follows the American version and the Canadian English version but with celebrity Housemates.

At the start of the week, a competition is held to determine the Patron de la maison (Head of Household). This person, in addition to being immune for the week and having access to a luxurious private suite, is also responsible for nominating two people for eviction. Following the nominations, the Véto (Power of Veto) competition allows a select number of housemates to try to win the ability to either save one of the nominees from possible eviction (forcing the Patron de la maison to name a replacement nominee) or leave the nominations as is. The week culminates with a live eviction, where each celebrity housemate secretly casts their vote to evict one of the nominees. This process repeats itself until there are three people remaining, where a three-part competition to name the final Patron de la maison is held, with the winner guaranteed a spot in the Final 2, and the sole power to decide which of their opponents will join them. At the end, the one celebrity remaining (as determined by a vote from their evicted ex-housemates) will be crowned the winner.

Similar to other versions of Big Brother, twists may be introduced that may alter the normal proceedings of a typical week in the house. Double evictions (where two people are evicted on the same day), a competition to allow a previously-evicted housemate to return, immunity granted to more than just the Patron de la maison are some examples of twists that have been used in this version.

 Spin-off shows 
In addition to the main show, which airs Monday to Thursday, a daily show called Big Brother 7/7 airs on sister network Vrak. This program features unedited, never-before-seen moments in the house, post-eviction discussions with the housemates, as well as moments from the weekend (when the main show does not air).

Season 2 introduced a new spin-off show: Big Brother : Gérants d'estrade'' (English: Big Brother: Stage Managers). Also airing on Noovo immediately following the live eviction, the programme features commentary on the week that was and the progress of the celebrity housemates thus far.

The House 
For the program's first season, the house that the celebrities lived was located in Île Bizard in the Montreal borough of L'Île-Bizard–Sainte-Geneviève, a 28,000 ft² (2601m²), three-floor mansion—the largest Big Brother house in the format's history, and one of the rare instances where the Big Brother house was an actual house instead of a custom-built habitat constructed on a soundstage—was retrofitted with 73 cameras.

For Season 2, due to the house used in Season 1 being put up for sale, the house reverted to a dwelling built on a soundstage, in line with other versions of the format. This house was 16,000 ft² large and was fitted with 69 cameras.

Series

Notes
: In Season 1, all previously evicted housemates (bar one) voted to choose the winner. From Season 2 onwards, a jury of the 7 last evicted housemates will instead choose the winner.
: Sixteen people were announced, but one housemate was removed from the lineup and replaced after testing positive for COVID-19. However, following the premiere event, that decision was overturned, and the housemate entered one week after the launch.

References

External links
Official website on Noovo.ca

Television shows filmed in Montreal
L'Île-Bizard–Sainte-Geneviève
2020s Canadian reality television series
Big Brother Canada
Noovo original programming
Canadian television series based on Dutch television series
2021 Canadian television series debuts